The 2003 Chevy Rock & Roll 400 was the 26th stock car race of the 2003 NASCAR Winston Cup Series season and the 46th iteration of the event. The race was held on Saturday, September 6, 2003, before a crowd of 105,000 in Richmond, Virginia, at Richmond International Raceway, a 0.75 miles (1.21 km) D-shaped oval. The race took the scheduled 400 laps to complete. At race's end, Penske Racing South driver Ryan Newman would hold off the field on a late restart with four to go to win his seventh career NASCAR Winston Cup Series win and his sixth win of the season. To fill out the podium, Jeremy Mayfield of Evernham Motorsports and Ricky Rudd of Wood Brothers Racing would finish second and third, respectively.

Background 

Richmond International Raceway (RIR) is a 3/4-mile (1.2 km), D-shaped, asphalt race track located just outside Richmond, Virginia in Henrico County. It hosts the Monster Energy NASCAR Cup Series and Xfinity Series. Known as "America's premier short track", it formerly hosted a NASCAR Camping World Truck Series race, an IndyCar Series race, and two USAC sprint car races.

Entry list

Practice

First practice 
The first practice session was held on Friday, September 5, at 11:20 AM EST, and would last for two hours.

Second practice 
The second practice session was held on Friday, September 5, at 4:45 PM EST, and would last for 45 minutes.

Third and final practice 
The third and final practice session, sometimes referred to as Happy Hour, was held on Friday, September 5, at 6:10 PM EST, and would last for 45 minutes.

Qualifying 
Qualifying was held on Friday, September 5, at 3:05 PM EST. Each driver would have two laps to set a fastest time; the fastest of the two would count as their official qualifying lap. Positions 1-36 would be decided on time, while positions 37-43 would be based on provisionals. Six spots are awarded by the use of provisionals based on owner's points. The seventh is awarded to a past champion who has not otherwise qualified for the race. If no past champ needs the provisional, the next team in the owner points will be awarded a provisional.

Larry Foyt and Billy Bigley would fail to qualify.

Full qualifying results

Post-race conflict
This race was notable for the post-race conflict between veteran Ricky Rudd and 3rd year Winston Cup driver Kevin Harvick. With 8 laps to go with Harvick running 2nd and Rudd running 3rd, Rudd got into the back of Harvick heading into turn 1. Harvick's car got sideways for a bit and eventually snapped around on him and crashed into the outside wall in turn 1 bringing out the 14th and final caution of the race. Once the race concluded, Rudd had finished 3rd which meant Rudd went over to pit road while the others who did not finish in the top 5 went to their haulers behind pit road. Harvick, who finished 16th, knew that Rudd had finished in the top 5 and went to pit road and pulled up alongside his car. Both crews of Harvick and Rudd came running out to their drivers. Rudd came halfway out of his car while Harvick got out of his car with the help of his crew and the two began to yell back and forth at each other with NASCAR officials yelling at Harvick to get off of the top of his car. Harvick went down from Rudd's car with one of his crew members holding him back while another of Havick's crew members behind him jumped up in the air and landed on Rudd's hood damaging his car. Harvick got separated from Rudd and began to walk away. As he was walking away, Harvick took his HANS device and threw it at Rudd's direction landing on top of Rudd's roof. Rudd took the device and threw it back at Harvick. Harvick said in his interview that Rudd took a "goddamn cheap shot at us. And if he's gonna take a cheap shot, he's going to get one back I promise you that." Rudd said that Harvick braked a little harder than he thought he would and said that the damage to his car from Harvick's crew was unnecessary. He finished his interview by saying "I couldn’t hear him. He’s got that little yap-yap mouth. I couldn’t tell what he was saying."

Race results

References 

2003 NASCAR Winston Cup Series
NASCAR races at Richmond Raceway
September 2003 sports events in the United States
2003 in sports in Virginia